Sebastianites Cricket and Athletic Club are a first-class cricket team based in Moratuwa, Sri Lanka. Their home ground is De Soysa Stadium.

History
The club's name derives from its close association with St. Sebastian's College, Moratuwa, whose students are known as Sebastianites. The club played several first-class and List A matches at the College ground.

Sebastianites Cricket and Athletic Club competed in the first-class Premier Trophy for 20 seasons from 1990–91 to 2009–10. They played 184 matches, for 38 wins, 50 losses and 96 draws. In the same period they played 87 List A matches, with 37 wins, 42 losses, one tie and seven matches where a result could not be achieved. They played first-class cricket again during the Premier Trophy Tier B tournament in the 2019–20 season.

Records

Partnership records
 1st – 171  	BCMS Mendis & SK Silva	
 2nd –	247  	TM Dilshan & GG Ranga Yasalal		
 3rd –	308  	SN Wijesinghe & RHS Silva	
 4th – 203  	MMDNRG Perera & KHRK Fernando	
 5th –	181*	BCMS Mendis & MMDNRG Perera	
 6th –	131  	SHSMK Silva & KADJ Siriwardene	
 7th –	140  	KHRK Fernando & KADM Fernando	
 8th –	149  	WJM Fernando & KADM Fernando	
 9th – 164  	BCMS Mendis & D Seneviratne	
 10th – 92  	MPA Cooray & WJM Fernando

References

External links
 Cricinfo
 Sebastianites Cricket and Athletic Club at CricketArchive

Sri Lankan first-class cricket teams